Nazhaddi Imaliyevich Ibragimov (born 5 July 1987) is a former Russian professional football player.

Club career
He made his Russian Football National League debut for FC Terek Grozny on 25 June 2006 in a game against FC Oryol.

External links
 
 

1987 births
Living people
Russian footballers
FC Akhmat Grozny players
FC Gornyak Uchaly players
FC Baltika Kaliningrad players
Chechen people
Association football defenders
FC Mashuk-KMV Pyatigorsk players